Weymouth Pier is a peninsula between Weymouth Harbour and Weymouth Beach, in Dorset, England. It was intended to extend Weymouth's esplanade, and consists of a theatre, Weymouth Pavilion; pleasure pier; car parking and a cross-channel ferry terminal. The entire site underwent redevelopment to include new facilities for the 2012 Olympic Games, including the Weymouth Sea Life Tower.

Early history

There is little documented history to the origins of Weymouth Pier, though it is believed that a structure existed as early as 1812.

The new pier

When built, the pier was divided into two halves. The southern side of the deck was reserved for commercial use, and was fitted out to load and unload cargo from harbour ships, including electric cranes, electrically operated capstans and two railway tracks. The pier was capable of handling one passenger vessel, three cargo vessels and two pleasure steamers simultaneously. 

The northern side, fenced off from the industrial section, was a promenade area. This included shelters, a diving stage, changing rooms, and at night the whole promenade area would be illuminated, with views across Weymouth Bay and Nothe Fort.

Key dates

 1840: Considerable change was made to the port area when a pile-pier, filled with a mixture of Portland stone and shingle concrete, was built on the northern edge of the harbour;
 1877: A cargo stage was added;
 1889: A landing stage and baggage handling hall were built;
 1908: The Weymouth Pavilion opened;
 1930s: The pier was rebuilt;
 13 July 1933: The new Weymouth Pier officially opened; the ceremony was carried out by the Prince of Wales, soon to become King Edward VIII;
 1954: The Ritz Theatre Renamed after the war) was destroyed in a fire;
 1961: A New Pavilion opened;
 1971-1972 The pier was widened to create a new terminal and a large car park to serve the ferry port and Weymouth Pavilion
 1993: The Alexandra Gardens Theatre damaged by fire;
 2007–2011: Redevelopment of the entire peninsula was planned for the 2012 Olympic Games but apart from an observation tower (known as Jurassic Skyline) this did not take place.

See also
 Pavilion Theatre
 Pier Bandstand

External links
Weymouth Pavilion Development
Weymouth Pier

1812 establishments in England
Buildings and structures in Weymouth, Dorset
Geography of Weymouth, Dorset
Tourist attractions in Weymouth, Dorset
Piers in Dorset

es:Weymouth Pavilion